Mesenzana is a comune (municipality) in the Province of Varese in the Italian region Lombardy, located about  northwest of Milan and about  northwest of Varese.

The municipality of Mesenzana contains the frazioni (subdivisions, mainly villages and hamlets) Malpensata, Molino d'Anna, Pezza, Maro, Cà Bianca nuova, Pianazzo, Piatta, Alpe Cavoglio, Gesiola del monte San Martino, and Le Cascine.

Mesenzana borders the following municipalities: Brissago-Valtravaglia, Cassano Valcuvia, Duno, Grantola, Montegrino Valtravaglia.

Demographic evolution

References

External links
 www.mesenzana.com

Cities and towns in Lombardy